Maurice Lehmann (1895–1974) was a French actor, director and producer of the stage and screen. He starred in the 1923 film Koenigsmark in which he played the title role. In 1956 he was appointed President of the Jury in the Cannes Film Festival.

Biography
He entered as a boarder at the Comedie-French from 1916 to 1919. He then managed theaters in the Porte Saint-Martin, the Ambigu, the Renaissance, Mogador, Edward VII and the Empire.

Selected filmography
 Koenigsmark (1923)
 Pasteur (1935)
 The Lady of the Camellias (1953)

References

Bibliography
 Goble, Alan. The Complete Index to Literary Sources in Film. Walter de Gruyter, 1999.

External links

1895 births
1974 deaths
French film directors
French film producers
French male stage actors
French male film actors
French male silent film actors
Male actors from Paris
20th-century French male actors
Directors of the Paris Opera
Commandeurs of the Légion d'honneur
Burials at Père Lachaise Cemetery